Legislative definitions of a federal agency are varied, and even contradictory. The official United States Government Manual offers no definition. While the Administrative Procedure Act definition of "agency" applies to most executive branch agencies, Congress may define an agency however it chooses in enabling legislation, and through subsequent litigation often involving the Freedom of Information Act and the Government in the Sunshine Act. These further cloud attempts to enumerate a list of agencies.

The executive branch of the federal government includes the Executive Office of the President and the United States federal executive departments (whose secretaries belong to the Cabinet). Employees of the majority of these agencies are considered civil servants.

The majority of the independent agencies of the United States government are also classified as executive agencies (they are independent in that they are not subordinated under a Cabinet position). There are a small number of independent agencies that are not considered part of the executive branch, such as the Congressional Research Service and the United States Sentencing Commission, which are legislative and judicial agencies, respectively.

United States Congress

The U.S. Congress is the bicameral legislature of the United States government, and is made up of two chambers: United States Senate (the upper chamber), and United States House of Representatives (The lower chamber). Together, the two chambers exercise authority over the following legislative agencies:

Congress also maintains special administrative agencies like:
 Capitol Police Board which governs the United States Capitol Police (USCP)
 The office of the Architect of the Capitol (AOC) who is in charge of maintaining the Capitol Building, including the Capitol Visitor Center (CVC) and the United States Botanic Garden (USBG).

The legislature is also in charge of the Library of Congress (LOC).  A national library dedicated to national records and administers various programs, agencies, and services including:
 Global Legal Information Network (GLIN)
 Congressional Research Service (CRS)
 United States Copyright Office (USCO) and the Copyright Royalty Board (CRB)
 National Library Service for the Blind and Print Disabled

Federal judiciary of the United States

Agencies within the judicial branch:
 Marshal of the Supreme Court of the United States
 Supreme Court of the United States Police
 Administrative Office of the United States Courts
 Federal Judicial Center
 Judicial Conference of the United States
 Judicial Panel on Multidistrict Litigation
 United States Sentencing Commission
 Probation and Pretrial Services System
 Defender Services

Specialty courts 
 Court of Appeals for Veterans Claims
 Court of Appeals for the Armed Forces
 Court of Appeals for the Federal Circuit
 United States Tax Court
 Court of Federal Claims
 Court of International Trade
 Bankruptcy Courts
 Alien Terrorist Removal Court
 Foreign Intelligence Surveillance Court
 Foreign Intelligence Surveillance Court of Review

Executive Office of the President 

The President of the United States is the chief executive of the Federal Government.  He is in charge of executing federal laws and approving, or vetoing, new legislation passed by Congress.  The President resides in the Executive Residence (EXR) maintained by the Office of Administration (OA).

To effectively run the country's affairs, the President also maintains councils regarding various issues, including:

White House Office

United States Department of Agriculture (USDA)

Office of the Secretary of Agriculture

Under Secretary of Agriculture for Farm Production and Conservation (FPAC) 
 Farm Service Agency (FSA)
 Commodity Credit Corporation (CCC)
 Natural Resources Conservation Service (NRCS)
 Risk Management Agency (RMA)
 Federal Crop Insurance Corporation (FCIC)
 Farm Production and Conservation Business Center (FBC)

Under Secretary of Agriculture for Food, Nutrition, and Consumer Services (FNCS) 
 Food and Nutrition Service (FNS)
 Center for Nutrition Policy and Promotion (CNPP)

Under Secretary of Agriculture for Food Safety 
 Food Safety and Inspection Service

Under Secretary of Agriculture for Marketing and Regulatory Programs (MRP) 
 Agricultural Marketing Service (AMS)
 Federal Grain Inspection Service (FGIS)
 Animal and Plant Health Inspection Service (APHIS)
 Plant Protection and Quarantine (PPQ)
 Wildlife Services (WS)

Under Secretary of Agriculture for Natural Resources and Environment (NRE) 
 United States Forest Service (USFS)
 International Institute of Tropical Forestry

Under Secretary of Agriculture for Research, Education, and Economics (REE) 
 Agricultural Research Service (ARS)
 National Agricultural Library (NAL)
 Economic Research Service (ERS)
 National Agricultural Statistics Service (NASS)
 National Institute of Food and Agriculture (NIFA)
 Office of the Chief Scientist

Office of the Under Secretary for Rural Development (RD) 
 Rural Development
 Rural Business-Cooperative Service (RBCS)
 Rural Housing Service (RHS)
 Rural Utilities Service (RUS)

Office of the Under Secretary for Trade and Foreign Agricultural Affairs (TFAA) 
 Foreign Agricultural Service (FAS)

United States Department of Commerce

Office of the Secretary (OS) 
 Office of the Deputy Secretary
 Office of Business Liaison (OBL)
 Office of the Chief Financial Officer and Assistant Secretary for Administration (CFO/ASA)
 Office of Chief Information Officer (OCIO)
 Office of Executive Secretariat
 Office of General Counsel (OGC)
 Office of Legislative and Intergovernmental Affairs (OLIA)
 Office of Policy and Strategic Planning (OPSP)
 Office of Public Affairs (OPA)
 Office of Security (OSY)
 Office of the White House Liaison (OWHL)
 Office of Inspector General (OIG)
 Economic Development Administration (EDA)
 Minority Business Development Agency (MBDA)
 National Technical Information Service (NTIS)
 National Telecommunications and Information Administration (NTIA)
 Institute for Telecommunication Sciences (ITS)
 First Responder Network Authority (FirstNet)

Under Secretary of Commerce for Industry and Security/Bureau of Industry and Security (BIS) 
 Office of the Assistant Secretary for Export Administration
 Operating Committee for Export Policy (OC)
 Office of Strategic Industries and Economic Security
 Office of Nonproliferation and Treaty Compliance
 Office of National Security and Technology Transfer Controls
 Office of Exporter Services
 Office of Technology Evaluation
 Office of Export Enforcement (OEE)

Under Secretary of Commerce for Economic Affairs (OUS/EA) 
 Bureau of Economic Analysis (BEA)
 United States Census Bureau

Under Secretary of Commerce for Intellectual Property/United States Patent and Trademark Office (USPTO) 
 Trademark Official Gazette
 Patent Trial and Appeal Board
 Trademark Trial and Appeal Board
 Office of the Commissioner of Patents
 Office of the Commissioner of Trademarks

Under Secretary of Commerce for International Trade/International Trade Administration (ITA) 
 United States Commercial Service (CS)

Under Secretary of Commerce for Oceans and Atmosphere/National Oceanic and Atmospheric Administration (NOAA) 
 Alliance for Coastal Technologies
 National Environmental Satellite, Data, and Information Service (NESDIS)
 National Marine Fisheries Service (NMFS)/NOAA Fisheries Office of Law Enforcement
 National Ocean Service (NOS)
 National Weather Service (NWS)
 National Geodetic Survey (NGS)
 Office of Marine and Aviation Operations (OMAO)
 NOAA Commissioned Officer Corps
 Office of Oceanic and Atmospheric Research (OAR)

Under Secretary of Commerce for Standards and Technology 
 National Institute of Standards and Technology (NIST)

United States Department of Defense (DOD)

Office of the Secretary of Defense (OSD)

Defense agencies

National intelligence agencies

Defense field activities

Universities and research institutes

Unified combatant commands 
 United States Africa Command (USAFRICOM) (AF • AR • NAV • MARFOR)
 United States Central Command (USCENTCOM) (AF • AR • NAV • MARFOR)
 United States Northern Command (USNORTHCOM) (AR • NAV • MARFOR)
 United States European Command (USEUCOM) (AF • AR • NAV • MARFOR)
 United States Indo-Pacific Command (USINDOPACOM) (AF • AR • MARFOR • NAV)
 United States Southern Command (USSOUTHCOM) (AR • MARFOR • NAV)
 United States Space Command (USSPACECOM)/ (AR • SF)
 United States Special Operations Command (USSOCOM) (AF • AR • MARFOR)
 United States Strategic Command (MARFOR • NAV)
 United States Cyber Command (USCYBERCOM) (AF • AR • MARFOR • NAV)
 United States Transportation Command (AF • AR • NAV • JECC)

Joint agencies

Department of the Army

Office of the Secretary of the Army

U.S. Army Commands

U.S. Army Direct Reporting Units

U.S. Army Field Operating Agencies

Department of the Navy

Office of the Secretary of the Navy

U.S. Navy Functional Operating Forces

Shore Establishment and Activities, Echelon II

U.S. Navy Field Support Activities

United States Marine Corps (USMC)

Department of the Air Force

Office of the Secretary of the Air Force

U.S. Air Force

U.S. Air Force Major Commands

Reserve and Auxiliary Components

Direct Reporting Units

Field Operating Agencies

United States Department of Education

Office of the Secretary of Education (OSE)

Office of Deputy Secretary of Education (ODSE) 
 Office of Elementary and Secondary Education
 Office of Migrant Education
 Office of Safe and Healthy Students
 Office of English Language Acquisition, Language Enhancement, and Academic Achievement for Limited English Language Proficient Students
 Office of Special Education and Rehabilitative Services
 Office of Special Education Programs
 Rehabilitation Services Administration

Institute of Education Sciences (IES)

Office of the Under Secretary (OUS)

White House initiatives and operating commissions

Advisory bodies

Federally-aided corporations

United States Department of Energy

 Leadership offices
 Office of the Secretary
 Office of the Deputy Secretary
 Office of the Under Secretary for Infrastructure
 Office of the Under Secretary for Science and Innovation
 Office of the Under Secretary for Nuclear Security and Administrator of the National Nuclear Security Administration
 Program offices
 Advanced Research Projects Agency-Energy (ARPA-E)
 Artificial Intelligence and Technology Office (AITO)
 Loan Programs Office
 Office of Cybersecurity, Energy Security, and Emergency Response
 Office of Electricity
 Office of Energy Efficiency and Renewable Energy
 Office of Environmental Management
 Office of Fossil Energy and Carbon Management
 Office of Indian Energy Policy and Programs
 Office of Legacy Management
 Office of Nuclear Energy
 Office of Science
 Staff offices
 Office of Congressional and Intergovernmental Affairs
 Office of Economic Impact and Diversity
 Office of Enterprise Assessments
 Office of Environment, Health, Safety, and Security
 Office of Hearings and Appeals
 Office of Inspector General
 Office of Intelligence and Counterintelligence
 Office of International Affairs
 Office of Management
 Office of Policy
 Office of Project Management
 Office of Public Affairs
 Office of Small and Disadvantaged Business Utilization
 Office of Technology Transitions
 Office of the Chief Financial Officer
 Office of the Chief Human Capital Officer           
 Office of the Chief Information Officer
 Office of the General Counsel
 Office of NEPA Policy and Compliance
 Power administrations and other agencies                   
 Federal Energy Regulatory Commission
 National Nuclear Security Administration
 Energy Information Administration
 Bonneville Power Administration
 Southeastern Power Administration
 Southwestern Power Administration
 Western Area Power Administration
 National Laboratories & Technology Centers
 Ames Laboratory
 Argonne National Laboratory
 Brookhaven National Laboratory
 Fermi National Accelerator Laboratory
 Idaho National Laboratory
 Lawrence Berkeley National Laboratory
 Lawrence Livermore National Laboratory
 Los Alamos National Laboratory
 National Energy Technology Laboratory
 National Renewable Energy Laboratory
 New Brunswick Laboratory
 Oak Ridge Institute for Science and Education
 Oak Ridge National Laboratory
 Pacific Northwest National Laboratory
 Princeton Plasma Physics Laboratory
 Radiological and Environmental Sciences Laboratory
 Sandia National Laboratories
 Savannah River Ecology Laboratory
 Savannah River National Laboratory
 SLAC National Accelerator Laboratory
 Thomas Jefferson National Accelerator Facility
 Field sites
 Carlsbad Field Office
 Environmental Management Los Alamos Field Office
 Golden Field Office
 Idaho Operations Office
 Oak Ridge Office of Environmental Management
 Office of River Protection
 Portsmouth/Paducah Project Office
 Richland Operations Office
 Savannah River Operations Office
 Office of Science Field Offices
 Pacific Northwest Site Office

United States Department of Health and Human Services

 Office of the Secretary (OS)
 Immediate Office of the Secretary [IOS]
 Office of the Assistant Secretary for Administration
 Program Support Center
 Office of the Assistant Secretary for Financial Resources
 Office of the Assistant Secretary for Legislation
 Office of the Assistant Secretary for Planning and Evaluation
 Office of the Assistant Secretary for Public Affairs
 Office of the Assistant Secretary for Health
 Office of the Assistant Secretary for Preparedness and Response
 Biomedical Advanced Research and Development Authority
 Center for Faith and Opportunity Initiative
 Departmental Appeals Board
 Office for Civil Rights
 Office of Global Affairs
 Office of Inspector General
 Office of Intergovernmental and External Affairs
 Office of Medicare Hearings and Appeals
 Office of the Chief Technology Officer
 Office of the General Counsel
 Office of the National Coordinator for Health Information Technology
 Administration on Aging
 Administration for Children and Families
 Administration for Native Americans
 Administration on Developmental Disabilities
 Office of Child Care
 Office of Child Support Enforcement
 Children's Bureau
 National Center on Child Abuse and Neglect
 Family and Youth Services Bureau
 Office of Head Start
 Office of Community Services
 Office of Family Assistance
 Office of Refugee Resettlement
 President's Committee for People with Intellectual Disabilities
 Agency for Healthcare Research and Quality
 Centers for Disease Control and Prevention
 CDC Washington Office
 Center for Global Health
 National Institute for Occupational Safety and Health
 Advisory Committee on Immunization Practices
 National Vital Statistics System
 Office for State, Tribal, Local and Territorial Support
 Office of Equal Employment Opportunity
 Office of Infectious Diseases
 National Center for Emerging and Zoonotic Infectious Diseases
 Division of High-Consequence Pathogens and Pathology (DHCPP)
 Viral Special Pathogens Branch (VSPB)
 National Center for HIV/AIDS, Viral Hepatitis, STD, and TB Prevention
 National Center for Immunization and Respiratory Diseases
 Office of Minority Health and Health Equity
 Office of Noncommunicable Diseases, Injury and Environmental Health
 National Center for Chronic Disease Prevention and Health Promotion
 National Center for Environmental Health/Agency for Toxic Substances and Disease Registry
 National Center for Injury Prevention and Control
 National Center on Birth Defects and Developmental Disabilities
 Office of Public Health Preparedness and Response
 Division of Emergency Operations
 Emergency Operations Center (EOC)
 Office of Public Health Science Services
 Center for Surveillance, Epidemiology and Laboratory Services
 National Center for Health Statistics
 Office of the Associate Director for Communication
 Office of the Associate Director for Policy
 Office of the Associate Director for Science
 Office of the Chief of Staff
 Office of the Chief Operating Officer
 National Institute for Occupational Safety and Health
 Epidemic Intelligence Service
 National Center for Health Statistics
 Centers for Medicare and Medicaid Services
 Food and Drug Administration
 National Center for Food Safety and Applied Nutrition
 Office of Criminal Investigations
 Health Resources and Services Administration
 Patient Affordable Healthcare Act Program
 Independent Payment Advisory Board
 Indian Health Service
 National Institutes of Health
 National Institutes of Health Police
 National Cancer Institute
 National Eye Institute
 National Heart, Lung, and Blood Institute
 Rocky Mountain Laboratories
 National Human Genome Research Institute
 National Institute on Aging
 National Institute on Alcohol Abuse and Alcoholism
 National Institute of Allergy and Infectious Diseases
 National Institute of Arthritis and Musculoskeletal and Skin Diseases
 National Institute of Biomedical Imaging and Bioengineering
 National Institute of Child Health and Human Development
 National Institute on Deafness and Other Communication Disorders
 National Institute of Dental and Craniofacial Research
 National Institute of Diabetes and Digestive and Kidney Diseases
 National Institute on Drug Abuse
 National Institute of Environmental Health Sciences
 National Institute of General Medical Sciences
 National Institute of Mental Health
 National Institute on Minority Health and Health Disparities
 National Institute of Neurological Disorders and Stroke
 National Institute of Nursing Research
 Center for Information Technology
 Center for Scientific Review
 Fogarty International Center
 National Center for Advancing Translational Sciences
 National Center for Complementary and Integrative Health
 NIH Clinical Center
 Public Health Service
 Federal Occupational Health
 Office of the Surgeon General
 United States Public Health Service Commissioned Corps
 Substance Abuse and Mental Health Services Administration

United States Department of Homeland Security

 Office of the Secretary
 Office of the Secretary
 Immediate Office of the Secretary
 Office of the Deputy Secretary
 Office of the Chief of Staff
 Military Advisor's Office
 Office of the Executive Secretary
 Joint Requirements Council
 Office of Strategy, Policy, and Plans
 Office of Immigration Statistics
 Office of International Affairs
 Office of General Counsel
 Office of Legislative Affairs
 Office of Public Affairs
 Office of Partnership and Engagement
 Homeland Security Advisory Council
 Office of State and Local Law Enforcement
 Private Sector Office
 Office for Civil Rights and Civil Liberties
 Office of the Citizenship and Immigration Services Ombudsman
 Office of the Immigration Detention Ombudsman
 Privacy Office

Headquarters Offices and Directorates
 Management Directorate
Federal Protective Service
 Office of Biometric Identity Management
 Office of the Chief Financial Officer
 Office of the Chief Information Officer
 Office of the Chief Human Capital Officer
 Office of the Chief Procurement Officer
 Office of the Chief Readiness Support Officer
 Canine and Equine Governance Board
 Office of the Chief Security Officer
 Science and Technology Directorate
 Office of Intelligence and Analysis
 Current and Emerging Threats Center
 Homeland Identities, Targeting and Exploitation Center
 Transnational Organized Crime Mission Center
 Counterterrorism Mission Center
 Counterintelligence Mission Center
 Cyber Mission Center
 Economic Security Mission Center
 Office of Operations Coordination
 National Operations Center
 Countering Weapons of Mass Destruction Office
 Chief Medical Officer
 Office of Inspector General

Component Agencies 
 Federal Emergency Management Agency
 United States Fire Administration
 National Flood Insurance Program
 Center for Domestic Preparedness
 Emergency Management Institute
 Mount Weather Emergency Operations Center
 Federal Insurance and Mitigation Administration
 Cybersecurity and Infrastructure Security Agency
 Cybersecurity Division
 National Cybersecurity and Communications Integration Center
 National Council of Statewide Interoperability Coordinators (NCSWIC)
 Infrastructure Security Division
 Emergency Communications Division
 National Risk Management Center
 Integrated Operations Division
 Stakeholder Engagement Division
 National Emergency Technology Guard (inactive, but can be activated by the director of CISA)
 Federal Law Enforcement Training Centers
 Transportation Security Administration
 Federal Air Marshal Service
 United States Citizenship and Immigration Services
 United States Coast Guard
 Coast Guard Intelligence
 Coast Guard Investigative Service
 United States Coast Guard Police
 United States Coast Guard Yard
 United States Coast Guard Research and Development Center
 United States Coast Guard Academy
 United States Coast Guard Training Center Cape May
 United States Coast Guard Reserve
 United States Coast Guard Auxiliary
 National Ice Center
 United States Customs and Border Protection
 Air and Marine Operations
 United States Border Patrol
 Office of Field Operations
 Office of Trade
 United States Immigration and Customs Enforcement (ICE)
 Enforcement and Removal Operations
 Homeland Security Investigations
 Office of Professional Responsibility
 Office of the Principal Legal Advisor
 United States Secret Service
 United States Secret Service Uniformed Division
 James J. Rowley Training Center

United States Department of Housing and Urban Development

Executive Offices 
 Office of the Secretary
 Office of the Deputy Secretary
 Office of Hearings and Appeals
 Office of Small and Disadvantaged Business Utilization
 Office of Faith-Based and Neighborhood Partnerships
 Office of Congressional and Intergovernmental Relations
 Office of Public Affairs

Administrative Offices 
 Office of Departmental Equal Employment Opportunity
 Office of General Counsel
 Departmental Enforcement Center
 Office of the Assistant Secretary for Administration
 Chief Administrative Office
 Office of the Chief Human Capital Officer 
 Office of the Chief Procurement Officer
 Office of the Chief Financial Officer
 Office of the Chief Information Officer
 Office of Inspector General

Agencies 
 Government National Mortgage Association
 Office of Community Planning and Development
 Office of Fair Housing and Equal Opportunity
 Fair Housing Assistance Program
 Fair Housing Initiatives Program
 National Fair Housing Training Academy
 Office of Field Policy and Management
 Office of Housing
 Federal Housing Administration
 Office of Lead Hazard Control and Healthy Homes
 Office of Policy Development and Research
 Office of Public and Indian Housing
 Real Estate Assessment Center

United States Department of the Interior (DOI)

 United States Secretary of the Interior
 United States Deputy Secretary of the Interior
 CHCO
 CHRO
 General Counsel
 CIO
 CISO
 CTO
 Science
 Technology
 Administrative Law
 White House Liaison
 CPO
 COO
 Management
 Administration
 Justice
 Communications
 Public Affairs
 Congressional and Intergovernmental Affairs
 Energy
 Education
 National Interior University
 Office of Security
 Indian Arts and Craft Board
 Office of Emergency Management
 DOTI Police
 National Interior Library
 Office of International Affairs
 Office of Interior Statistics
 Office of Interior Intelligence
 Bureau of Indian Affairs
 Bureau of Indian Affairs Police
 Bureau of Indian Education
 DOTI Office of the Inspector General
 Bureau of Land Management
 Bureau of Land Management Office of Law Enforcement
 Bureau of Ocean Energy Management
 Bureau of Reclamation
 BOR Police
 Hoover Dam Police (dissolved)
 Bureau of Safety and Environmental Enforcement
 Fish and Wildlife Service
 National Wildlife Refuge System
 NWRS Division of Refuge Law Enforcement
 Sport Fishing and Boating Partnership Council
 FWS Office of Law Enforcement
 Endangered Species Program
 National Park Service
 United States Park Police
 Office of Insular Affairs
 Office of Surface Mining
 National Mine Map Repository
 United States Geological Survey
 Federal Consulting Group

United States Department of Justice

 Office of the Attorney General
 Office of the Deputy Attorney General
 Office of the Associate Attorney General
 Office of the Solicitor General
 Special Counsel's Office
 Antitrust Division
 Civil Division
 Civil Rights Division
 Criminal Division
 Environment and Natural Resources Division
 Justice Management Division
 Asset Forfeiture Fund
 National Security Division
 Tax Division
 Bureau of Alcohol, Tobacco, Firearms and Explosives
 Bureau of Prisons
 Federal Prison Industries (aka Unicor)
 National Institute of Corrections
 Community Relations Service
 Drug Enforcement Administration
 El Paso Intelligence Center
 Office of National Security Intelligence
 Executive Office for Immigration Review
 Board of Immigration Appeals
 Executive Office for Organized Crime Drug Enforcement Task Forces
 Executive Office for United States Attorneys
 Executive Office for United States Trustees
 Federal Bureau of Investigation
 Intelligence Branch
 National Security Branch
 Counterterrorism Division
 Criminal, Cyber, Response, and Services Branch
 Critical Incident Response Group
 National Center for the Analysis of Violent Crime
 Strategic Information and Operations Center
 Crisis Negotiation Unit
 Behavioral Analysis Unit
 Science and Technology Branch
 FBI Laboratory
 FBI Criminal Justice Information Services Division
 Information and Technology Branch
 Human Resources Branch
 FBI Academy
 National Gang Intelligence Center
 Foreign Claims Settlement Commission of the United States
 INTERPOL Washington – United States National Central Bureau
 Office of Community Oriented Policing Services
 Office of Justice Programs
 Bureau of Justice Assistance
 Bureau of Justice Statistics
 National Criminal Justice Reference Service
 National Institute of Justice
 Office for Victims of Crime
 Office of Juvenile Justice and Delinquency Prevention
 Office of Sex Offender Sentencing, Monitoring, Apprehending, Registering, and Tracking (SMART)
 Office of Legal Counsel
 Office of Legal Policy
 Office of the Pardon Attorney
 Office on Violence Against Women
 Offices of the United States Attorneys
 United States Marshals Service
 Justice Prisoner and Alien Transportation System
 United States Parole Commission
 Office of Information Policy
 Office of Legislative Affairs
 Office of Public Affairs
 Office of Professional Responsibility
 Office of the Inspector General
 Office of Tribal Justice
 Professional Responsibility Advisory Office

United States Department of Labor (DOL)

Office of the Secretary (OSEC)

Offices under the Deputy Secretary of Labor

Administrations 
 Employee Benefits Security Administration
 Employment and Training Administration
 Mine Safety and Health Administration
 Occupational Safety and Health Administration

Boards under the Office of Administrative Law Judges 
 Administrative Review Board
 Benefits Review Board
 Employees' Compensation Appeals Board

Bureaus 
 Bureau of International Labor Affairs
 Bureau of Labor Statistics
 Women's Bureau

Miscellaneous 
 National Labor Library
 Veterans' Employment and Training Service
 Wage and Hour Division
 Wirtz Labor Library

United States Department of State (DOS)

Office of the Secretary 
 Chief of Staff
 Bureau of Intelligence and Research
 Bureau of Legislative Affairs
 Office of the Legal Adviser
 Executive Secretariat
 Operations Center
 Executive Secretariat Staff
 Advance and Staffing Division
 Records and Information Management Division
 Executive Office of the Executive Secretariat
 ExecTech Office
 Office of the Chief of Protocol
 Counselor of the Department
 Office of the United States Global AIDS Coordinator and Health Diplomacy
 Policy Planning Staff
 Secretary's Foreign Affairs Policy Board
 Office of Civil Rights
 Office of the Ombudsman
 Ombuds Services Office
 Workplace Conflict Prevention and Resolution Center (wCPRc)
 Foreign Service Grievance Board
 Secretary's Open Forum
 Office of Hostage Affairs
 Office of Global Women's Issues
 Office of the Coordinator for Cyber Issues
 Office of the Special Presidential Envoy for the Global Coalition to Defeat ISIS
 Office of Inspector General
 Iran Action Group
 Special Representative for Afghanistan Reconciliation
 Special Representative for Syria Engagement
 Special Representative for Venezuela
 United States Security Coordinator for Israel and the Palestinian Authority

Reporting to the Deputy Secretary for Management and Resources 
 Office of Foreign Assistance

Reporting to the Under Secretary for Arms Control and International Security 
 Bureau of Arms Control, Verification, and Compliance
 Bureau of International Security and Nonproliferation
 Bureau of Political-Military Affairs
 Office of Weapons Removal and Abatement
 International Security Advisory Board

Reporting to the Under Secretary for Human Rights, Civilian Security, and Democracy 
 Bureau of Conflict and Stabilization Operations
 Bureau of Counterterrorism
 Bureau of Democracy, Human Rights, and Labor
 Bureau of International Narcotics and Law Enforcement Affairs
 Office of Aviation
 Bureau of Population, Refugees, and Migration
 Office of Global Criminal Justice
 Office to Monitor and Combat Trafficking in Persons
 Office of International Religious Freedom
 Office of the Special Envoy to Monitor and Combat Anti-Semitism
 Office of the U.S. Special Coordinator for Tibetan Issues

Reporting to the Under Secretary for Environment, Energy, and Economic Growth 
 Bureau of Economic and Business Affairs
 Bureau of Energy Resources
 Bureau of Oceans and International Environmental and Scientific Affairs
 Office of the Chief Economist
 Office of Global Partnerships
 Office of the Science and Technology Advisor to the Secretary

Reporting to the Under Secretary for Management 
 Bureau of Administration
 Bureau of Budget and Planning
 Bureau of the Comptroller and Global Financial Services
 Bureau of Information Resource Management
 Diplomatic Telecommunications Service
 Bureau of Global Talent Management
 Office of the Director General of the Foreign Service and Director of Global Talent
 Foreign Service Institute
 Bureau of Consular Affairs
 Bureau of Diplomatic Security (DS)
 Diplomatic Security Service (DSS)
 Diplomatic Courier Service
 Rewards for Justice Program
 Bureau of Overseas Buildings Operations
 Office of Foreign Missions (OFM)
 Bureau of Medical Services
 Office of Management Strategy and Solutions
 Director of Diplomatic Reception Rooms
 Office of the White House Liaison

Reporting to the Under Secretary for Political Affairs 
 Bureau of African Affairs
 Bureau of East Asian and Pacific Affairs
 Bureau of European and Eurasian Affairs
 Bureau of International Organization Affairs
 Bureau of Near Eastern Affairs
 Bureau of South and Central Asian Affairs
 Bureau of Western Hemisphere Affairs

Reporting to the Under Secretary for Public Diplomacy and Public Affairs 
 Bureau of Educational and Cultural Affairs
 Bureau of Global Public Affairs
 Office of Policy, Planning and Resources for Public Affairs and Public Diplomacy
 Global Engagement Center
 International Expositions Unit
 United States Advisory Commission on Public Diplomacy

Permanent diplomatic missions 

 United States Mission to the African Union
 United States Mission to the Association of Southeast Asian Nations
 United States Mission to the Arab League
 United States Mission to the Council of Europe (and to all other European Agencies)
 United States Mission to International Organizations in Vienna
 United States Mission to the European Union
 United States Mission to the International Civil Aviation Organization
 United States Mission to the North Atlantic Treaty Organization
 United States Mission to the Organisation for Economic Co-operation and Development
 United States Mission to the Organization of American States
 United States Mission to the Organization for Security and Cooperation in Europe
 United States Mission to the United Nations
 United States Mission to the UN Agencies in Rome
 United States Mission to the United Nations Office and Other International Organizations in Geneva
 United States Observer Mission to the United Nations Educational, Scientific, and Cultural Organization
 United States Permanent Mission to the United Nations Environment Programme and the United Nations Human Settlements Programme

United States Department of Transportation

Operating administrations 
 Office of the Secretary
Immediate Office of the Secretary of Transportation
Office of the Deputy Secretary
Office of the Under Secretary of Transportation for Policy
Office of the Assistant Secretary for Transportation Policy
Office of the Chief Economist
Infrastructure Permitting Improvement Center
Office of the Assistant Secretary for Research and Technology
Bureau of Transportation Statistics
National Transportation Library
John A. Volpe National Transportation Systems Center
Office of the Assistant Secretary for Aviation and International Affairs
National Surface Transportation and Innovative Finance Bureau
Office of the Executive Secretariat
Office of Intelligence, Security, and Emergency Response
Office of the Chief Information Officer
Office of Public Affairs
Office of Public Engagement
Office of the Chief Financial Officer and Assistant Secretary for Budget and Programs
Office of the General Counsel
Office of the Assistant Secretary for Governmental Affairs
Office of Tribal Government Affairs
Office of the Assistant Secretary for Administration
Office of Hearings
Departmental Office of Civil Rights
Advisory Committee on Transportation Equity
Office of Small and Disadvantaged Business Utilization
Office of Drug and Alcohol Policy and Compliance 
 Office of Inspector General
Federal Aviation Administration
Federal Highway Administration
Federal Motor Carrier Safety Administration
Federal Railroad Administration
Federal Transit Administration
 Great Lakes St. Lawrence Seaway Development Corporation
 Maritime Administration
 United States Merchant Marine Academy
 National Highway Traffic Safety Administration
 Pipeline and Hazardous Materials Safety Administration

United States Department of the Treasury

Departmental offices 
 Office of the Secretary
 Office of the Deputy Secretary
 Office of the Chief of Staff
 Office of Inspector General
 Office of General Counsel
 Office of Legislative Affairs
 Office of Management
 Office of Public Affairs
 Office of Domestic Finance
 Office of Financial Institutions
 Community Development Financial Institutions Fund
 Financial Stability Oversight Council
 Office of Financial Research
 Terrorism Risk Insurance Program
 Small Business Lending Fund
 Federal Insurance Office
 Office of Financial Markets
 Federal Financing Bank
 Office of Fiscal Service
 Office of Financial Stability
 Office of Economic Policy
 Office of International Affairs
 Committee on Foreign Investment in the United States
 Office of Technical Assistance
 Office of Tax Policy
 Office of Terrorism and Financial Intelligence
 Office of Foreign Assets Control
 Office of Intelligence and Analysis
 Office of Terrorist Financing and Financial Crimes
 Treasury Executive Office for Asset Forfeiture
 Office of the Treasurer of the United States

Bureaus

United States Department of Veterans Affairs

Office of the Secretary of Veterans Affairs

Agencies

Independent agencies and government-owned corporations

Established under United States Constitution Article I, Section 4

Elections
 Election Assistance Commission
 EAC Office of Inspector General
 Federal Election Commission
 FEC Office of Inspector General

Established under Article I, Section 8

Administrative agencies
 Administrative Conference of the United States
 National Archives and Records Administration
 Office of Presidential Libraries
 Information Security Oversight Office
 Public Interest Declassification Board
 Office of the Federal Register

Civil service agencies
 Merit Systems Protection Board
 Office of Government Ethics
 Office of Personnel Management
 Human Resources University
 USOOPM Office of the Inspector General
 National Background Investigations Bureau
 Federal Executive Institute
 Chief Acquisition Officers Council
 Chief Human Capital Officers Council
 Chief Financial Officers Council
 Chief Information Officers Council
 Office of Special Counsel

Commerce regulatory agencies
 Federal Trade Commission
 FTC Office of the Inspector General
 Consumer Product Safety Commission
 CPSC Office of the Inspector General
 Federal Communications Commission
 Universal Service Fund
 Radio Amateur Civil Emergency Service
 Federal Housing Finance Agency
 Federal Housing Finance Board (defunct)
 United States International Trade Commission

Government commissions, committees, and consortium
 National Advisory Council on Violence Against Women
 Council of Inspectors General on Integrity and Efficiency
 United States Commission on International Religious Freedom
 Privacy and Civil Liberties Oversight Board
 Social Security Advisory Board
 Northwest Power Planning Council
 Northwest Power and Conservation Council
 Pacific Northwest Electric Power and Conservation Planning Council
 National Indian Gaming Commission
 Marine Mammal Commission
 Medicaid and CHIP Payment and Access Commission
 Migratory Birds Conservation Commission
 Mississippi River Commission
 National Bipartisan Commission on the Future of Medicare
 Federal Laboratory Consortium for Technology Transfer
 Federal Library and Information Center Committee
 Japan–United States Friendship Commission
 Fiscal Responsibility and Reform Commission
 Commission on Security and Cooperation in Europe (Helsinki Commission)
 Federal Interagency Committee on Education
 Federal Interagency Council on Statistical Policy
 Committee for the Implementation of Textile Agreements
 Federal Interagency Committee for the Management of Noxious and Exotic Weeds
 Federal Accounting Standards Advisory Board
 Federal Financial Institutions Examination Council
 Interagency Alternative Dispute Resolution Working Group
 Interagency Council on Homelessness
 Federal Geographic Data Committee
 U.S. Commission for the Preservation of America's Heritage Abroad

Education and broadcasting agencies
 Corporation for Public Broadcasting
 PBS Public Broadcasting Service
 NPR National Public Radio
 American Public Television APT
 Helen Keller National Center
 Institute of Museum and Library Services
 U.S. Agency for Global Media
 Voice of America
 Radio Free Europe/Radio Liberty
 Radio y Television Marti
 Radio Free Asia
 Middle Eastern Broadcasting Networks
 International Broadcasting Bureau
 National Constitution Center
 National Endowment for the Arts
 National Endowment for the Humanities
 Barry M. Goldwater Scholarship in Excellence and Education Program
 James Madison Memorial Fellowship Foundation
 Harry S. Truman Scholarship Foundation
 Morris K. Udall and Stewart L. Udall Foundation
 Vietnam Education Foundation

Energy and science agencies
 National Aeronautics and Space Administration (NASA)
 National Science Board
 National Science Foundation
 University Corporation for Atmospheric Research
 National Center for Atmospheric Research
 United States Antarctic Program
 United States Arctic Research Commission
 Nuclear Regulatory Commission
 Office of the Federal Coordinator, Alaska Natural Gas Transportation Projects
 Tennessee Valley Authority
 Tennessee Valley Authority Police

Foreign investment agencies
 African Development Foundation
 Export–Import Bank of the United States
 Inter-American Foundation
 U.S. International Development Finance Corporation
 U.S. Trade and Development Agency

Interior agencies
 Advisory Council on Historic Preservation
 United States Environmental Protection Agency
 United States Environmental Protection Agency Office of Enforcement and Compliance Assurance
 Presidio Trust
 Appalachian Regional Commission
 Delta Regional Authority
 Denali Commission
 American Battle Monuments Commission
 Delaware River Basin Commission
 Susquehanna River Basin Commission
 Northern Border Regional Commission

Labor agencies
 Federal Labor Relations Authority
 Federal Mediation and Conciliation Service
 Federal Mine Safety and Health Review Commission
 National Labor Relations Board
 National Mediation Board
 Occupational Safety and Health Review Commission
 Chemical Safety Board

Monetary and financial agencies
 Commodity Futures Trading Commission
 Farm Credit Administration
 Federal Reserve System
 Federal Reserve Police
 Consumer Financial Protection Bureau
 Federal Deposit Insurance Corporation
 National Credit Union Administration
 Central Liquidity Facility
 Securities and Exchange Commission
 Securities Investor Protection Corporation
 Small Business Administration

Postal agencies
 Military Postal Service Agency
 Postal Regulatory Commission
 United States Postal Service
 United States Postal Inspection Service
 US Postal Service Police
 Citizens' Stamp Advisory Committee
 USPS Office of the Inspector General
 US Philatelic Bureau
 US Stamp Printing Service

Retirement agencies
 Federal Retirement Thrift Investment Board
 Thrift Savings Plan
 Railroad Retirement Board
 Social Security Administration

Federal property and seat of government agencies
 Court Services and Offender Supervision Agency
 General Services Administration
 Federal Systems Integration and Management Center
 USAGov (formerly Federal Citizen Information Center)
 Office of the President-Elect
 National Capital Planning Commission
 Commission of Fine Arts

Transportation agencies
 Amtrak (National Railroad Passenger Corporation)
 Amtrak Police
 Federal Maritime Commission
 National Transportation Safety Board
 Surface Transportation Board

Volunteerism agencies
 Corporation for National and Community Service
 AmeriCorps
 AmeriCorps Organizations
 AmeriCorps VISTA
 Senior Corps
 Learn and Serve America
 National Civilian Community Corps
 Volunteers in Service to America
 USA Freedom Corps
 Presidential Freedom Scholarship Program
 President's Volunteer Service Award
 Peace Corps

Authority under Article II, Section 1

Defense and security agencies
 Central Intelligence Agency
 Central Intelligence Agency Security Protective Service
 Defense Nuclear Facilities Safety Board
 Office of the Director of National Intelligence
 National Intelligence Board
 Office of the National Counterintelligence Executive
 Intelligence Advanced Research Projects Activity
 Selective Service System
 National Security Commission on Artificial Intelligence

Authority under Amendment XIV

Civil rights agencies
 Commission on Civil Rights
 Equal Employment Opportunity Commission
 National Council on Disability

Other agencies and corporations
 Digital Opportunity Investment Trust

Joint programs and interagency agencies
 Joint Fire Science Program
 National Interagency Fire Center

Special Inspector General Office
 Special Inspector General for Afghanistan Reconstruction

Quasi-official agencies

Arts & cultural agencies
 Corporation for Travel Promotion
 John F. Kennedy Center for the Performing Arts
 National Trust for Historic Preservation
 National Building Museum
 National Gallery of Art
 Smithsonian Institution
 Smithsonian Police (Smithsonian Institution Office of Protection Services)
 National Zoological Police
 U.S. National Museum
 U.S. National Zoo
 U.S. National Theater
 Woodrow Wilson International Center for Scholars
 Washington National Cathedral Foundation
 Washington National Cathedral
 Washington National Cathedral Police

Museum agencies
 United States Holocaust Memorial Museum

Commerce & technology agencies
 North American Electric Reliability Corporation
 Municipal Securities Rulemaking Board
 National Futures Association
 Public Company Accounting Oversight Board
 Financial Industry Regulatory Authority
 Federal National Mortgage Association (Fannie Mae)
 Federal Home Loan Mortgage Corporation (Freddie Mac)
 U S Civilian Research & Development Foundation

Defense & diplomacy agencies
 American Institute in Taiwan
 East–West Center
 Millennium Challenge Corporation
 National Endowment for Democracy
 United States Institute of Peace
 Henry M. Jackson Foundation for the Advancement of Military Medicine

Human service & community development agencies
 National Industries for the Blind
 Neighborhood Reinvestment Corporation
 Access Board
 AbilityOne Commission
 National Institute of Building Sciences

Interior agencies
 National Fish and Wildlife Foundation
 National Park Foundation

Law & justice agencies
 Legal Services Corporation
 State Justice Institute
 Vera Institute of Justice
 National Center for Missing & Exploited Children

See also
 Congressionally chartered organizations
 Federal Advisory Committee Act
 Government-sponsored enterprises
 List of defunct or renamed United States federal agencies
 State-owned enterprises of the United States
 Federally funded research and development centers
 University Affiliated Research Center
 Number of United States political appointments by agency
 List of United States federal research and development agencies

References

Explanatory notes

Notes

Bibliography

External links
 US Government Manual, official online version of the United States Government Manual, continually updated.
 US Government Manual, official freely downloadable PDFs of annual printed versions.
 Federal Agency Directory, online database maintained by the Louisiana State University Libraries in partnership with the Federal Depository Library Program of the GPO
 A–Z Index of US Departments and Agencies, USA.gov, the US government's official web portal. Directory of agency contact information.
 CyberCemetery, online document archive of defunct US Federal Agencies, maintained by the University of North Texas Libraries in partnership with the Federal Depository Library Program of the GPO

 Federal

Federal agencies